Reijo Kalevi Leppänen (born 8 November 1951 in Turku, Finland) is a retired professional ice hockey player who played in the SM-liiga.  He played for TPS.  He was inducted into the Finnish Hockey Hall of Fame in 1992.

External links
 Finnish Hockey Hall of Fame bio

1951 births
Living people
Finnish ice hockey players
Ice hockey players at the 1980 Winter Olympics
Olympic ice hockey players of Finland
Sportspeople from Turku
HC TPS players
20th-century Finnish people